Anthophylax is a genus of beetles in the family Cerambycidae, containing the following species:

 Anthophylax attenuatus (Haldeman, 1847)
 Anthophylax cyaneus (Haldeman, 1847)
 Anthophylax hoffmani Beutenmüller, 1903
 Anthophylax viridis LeConte, 1850

References

Lepturinae